Kuzhithurai railway station (Station code: KZT) is the second-biggest station in Kanyakumari district (NSG 5 Category). For train transportation the Marthandam is the main hub for Kalkulam and Vilavancode talukas. The Kalkulam and Vilavancode talukas have the population around seven lakes. The Kuzhithurai station is found to be centered between Trivandrum–Kanniyakumari railway route. This railway station collection is more than seven crore per annum and a daily passenger patronage of more than 50,000 people. The station has two platforms and falls on the Kanniyakumari–Trivandrum line in the Trivandrum division of the Southern Railway zone. Most of all daily trains passing through the station halt in Kuzhithurai station

Time Table

Demanded Rail Services 

Extension of Trivandrum–Mangalore 16603/16604 Mavali Express up to Nagercoil
 A new overnight express from Velankanni to Kollam via Thanjavur, Trichy, Pudukkottai, Tirunelveli, Nagercoil, Kuzhithura and Trivandrum
 Kanniyakumari to Vasco da Gama, Goa daily train via Trivandrum and Ernakulam
 Kochuveli–Bangalore Overnight Express train via Kuzhithura, Nagercoil, Madurai, Erode, Salem and Hosur

See also
 Eraniel railway station
 Viranialur railway station
 Southern Railway zone
 Indian Railways

References

External links

 Satellite Map of Martandam Railway Station
 Kuzhithura Railway Station details

Railway stations in Kanyakumari district
Thiruvananthapuram railway division
Railway stations opened in 1979